Robert Tyler Davis (1904–1978) was an American art historian, writer and educator. During his lifetime, Davis occupied high ranking positions in several museums and galleries in the United States and Canada. He was Director of Education at the Albright-Knox Gallery, Director at the Portland Art Museum, the Montreal Museum of Fine Arts and the Vizcaya-Dade County Art Museum, now Vizcaya Museum and Gardens. Davis produced several publications including the book Native arts of the Pacific Northwest.

During his tenure at the Albright-Knox Gallery, Davis produced a report funded titled The Art Museum and the Secondary School, it is in this report that the first documented occurrence of the term "visual literacy" is recorded in literature.

References

American art historians
1904 births
1978 deaths
20th-century American historians
American male non-fiction writers
20th-century American male writers